This is a list of diplomatic missions in the Cook Islands. Although the Cook Islands is an associated state of New Zealand, . At present, the capital of Avarua hosts two missions. Additionally, there are embassies accredited to the Cook Islands and residing outside the country. They are in Canberra, Suva and Wellington.

Embassies/High Commissions

Avarua
 (High Commission)
 (High Commission)

Non-resident embassies

Honorary consulates

See also
Foreign relations of the Cook Islands
List of diplomatic missions of the Cook Islands

Notes

References

External links
 Foreign Representatives in the Cook Islands

Foreign relations of the Cook Islands
Cook Islands
Cook Islands-related lists
Lists of organisations based in the Cook Islands